The 'Sturmer Pippin' is a dessert apple cultivar, believed to be a 'Ribston Pippin' and 'Nonpareil' cross.

'Sturmer Pippin' is recorded as being presented to the Horticultural Society (later Royal Horticultural Society) by Ezekiel Dillistone in 1827.  The apple takes its name from the village of Sturmer, Essex.

Description
This apple is medium-sized, and has a  bright green skin becoming greenish to yellow and flushed red. A good picking time is mid-November to late November . One of the best English keeping apples, 'Sturmer Pippin' became widely grown and exported from Tasmania and New Zealand from the 1890s.

References

External links
 Sturmer pippins at Sturmer Nurseries

British apples
Dessert apples
Apple cultivars